Penny Arcade is a jazz album by Joe Farrell on the CTI Records label. It was recorded at the Van Gelder Studio in October 1973.

Track listing

Side one
"Penny Arcade" (Joe Beck) – 4:45
"Too High" (Stevie Wonder) – 13:15

Side two
"Hurricane Jane" (Joe Farrell) – 4:25
"Cloud Cream" (Joe Farrell) – 6:15
"Geo Blue" (Joe Farrell) – 7:30

Personnel
Joe Farrell – tenor and soprano sax, flute, piccolo
Herbie Hancock – piano
Joe Beck – guitar
Steve Gadd- drums
Herb Bushler – bass
Don Alias – conga

Recording credits
Engineer – Rudy Van Gelder
Producer – Creed Taylor
Cover photograph – Pete Turner
Liner photograph – Sheila Green Metzner
Album design – Bob Ciano

References

1973 albums
Joe Farrell albums
Albums produced by Creed Taylor
Albums recorded at Van Gelder Studio